Bladt Industries A/S is an international steel contractor specialising in large-scale and highly complex steel structures. Bladt Industries operate within three key areas of business providing steel solutions for the wind and renewable energy sector, for the oil and gas industry and for infrastructure. Bladt Industries was established in 1965 as the company Jørgen Bladt A/S.

Bladt Industries has contributed to several of the world's largest wind farms and oil and gas projects. Their range of products includes foundations and substations for offshore wind turbine projects, suctions anchors, topsides and jackets for oil and gas projects, as well as buildings, bridges and harbour structures for infrastructural projects.

Reference list 
Bladt Industries A/S has contributed/is contributing to several large projects e.g.:
 Offshore substations for
Anholt Offshore Wind Farm
Gunfleet Sands Offshore Wind Farm
Hornsea Wind Farm (expected to become the world's largest wind farm upon its completion)
Lillgrund Offshore Wind Farm
Nysted Wind Farm(Denmark's first offshore substation)
Nordsee One Offshore Wind Farm
Nordsee-Ost Offshore Wind Farm
Northwind Offshore Wind Farm
Robin Rigg Offshore Wind Farm
Rødsand B
Princess Amalia Wind Farm
Sandbank Offshore Wind Farm
Walney Wind Farm
 Offshore foundations
Anholt Offshore Wind Farm
Baltic 1 Offshore Wind Farm
Beatrice Wind Farm
Belwind Offshore Wind Farm
Egmond aan Zee
Gode Wind Farm
Gwynt y Môr
Horns Rev 2
London Array)
Samsø Offshore Wind Farm
Veja Mate Offshore Wind Farm
Walney Wind Farm

References

External links
 

Construction and civil engineering companies of Denmark
Companies based in Aalborg
Danish companies established in 1965
Construction and civil engineering companies established in 1965